Anopsiostes is a genus of beetles in the family Hybosoridae, described as a genus in 1982. It has two species: Anopsiostes punctatus, which is restricted to Ecuador, and Anopsiostes pauliani, which was discovered in Mexico.

References

Scarabaeoidea genera